Stack is a board game published in 1986 by BB Games.

Contents
Stack is a game in which the object is for a player to get one of their pieces on to the opponent's back row and keep it there one more turn.

Reception
Eric Solomon reviewed Stack for Games International magazine, and gave it 4 stars out of 5, and stated that "I would recommend Stack as the best two-player game of its type which I have seen."

References

Board games introduced in 1986